Sour John is a census-designated place (CDP) in Muskogee County, Oklahoma, United States. The population was 61 at the 2000 census.

Geography
Sour John is located at  (35.628588, -95.138131).

Sour John is immediately to the east of Greenleaf Lake and north of Oklahoma State Highway 10. 

Demographics

As of the census of 2000, there were 61 people, 23 households, and 18 families residing in the CDP. The population density was 10.7 people per square mile (4.1/km2). There were 27 housing units at an average density of 4.7/sq mi (1.8/km2). The racial makeup of the CDP was 67.21% White, 3.28% African American, 22.95% Native American, and 6.56% from two or more races.

There were 23 households, out of which 39.1% had children under the age of 18 living with them, 65.2% were married couples living together, 4.3% had a female householder with no husband present, and 21.7% were non-families. 17.4% of all households were made up of individuals, and 8.7% had someone living alone who was 65 years of age or older. The average household size was 2.65 and the average family size was 3.06.

In the CDP, the population was spread out, with 27.9% under the age of 18, 6.6% from 18 to 24, 27.9% from 25 to 44, 21.3% from 45 to 64, and 16.4% who were 65 years of age or older. The median age was 39 years. For every 100 females, there were 125.9 males. For every 100 females age 18 and over, there were 109.5 males.

The median income for a household in the CDP was $32,500, and the median income for a family was $43,750. Males had a median income of $38,750 versus $11,250 for females. The per capita income for the CDP was $23,772. There were 15.0% of families and 13.4% of the population living below the poverty line, including 10.0% of under eighteens and none of those over 64.

References

Census-designated places in Muskogee County, Oklahoma
Census-designated places in Oklahoma